Kevin Eriksson (born July 16, 1996) is a Swedish racing driver currently participating in the FIA World Rallycross Championship. He is the son of Olsbergs MSE team owner Andréas Eriksson. In 2016, he made his debut in FIA RX Supercar with a full-time entry.

Racing record

Complete FIA European Rallycross Championship results
(key)

Super1600

Complete FIA World Rallycross Championship results
(key)

Supercar

† Loss of fifteen championship points – stewards' decision.

RX Lites Cup

RallyX on Ice
(key)

Complete Global Rallycross Championship results
(key)

Supercar

References

Swedish racing drivers
European Rallycross Championship drivers
Global RallyCross Championship drivers

World Rallycross Championship drivers
Living people

1996 births